Aula is a settlement in the Gash-Barka region of Eritrea.

References

Populated places in Eritrea